John Lacey McCarthy (October 4, 1903 – May 29, 1973) was an American football player.

A native of San Francisco, McCarthy played college football for California. He later played professional football in the National Football League (NFL) as a tackle for the Duluth Eskimos during the 1927 season. He appeared in a total of eight NFL games, all of them as a starter.

References

1903 births
1973 deaths
California Golden Bears football players
Duluth Eskimos players
Players of American football from San Francisco
American football tackles